Siegfried Matthus (13 April 1934 – 27 August 2021) was a German composer, conductor, and festival founder and manager. Some of his operas, such as Judith, were premiered at the Komische Oper Berlin in East Berlin. In 1991, he founded the chamber opera festival Kammeroper Schloss Rheinsberg and directed it until 2018. In 2005, he composed a Te Deum for the reopening of the Dresden Frauenkirche. Matthus is considered one of Germany's most often performed contemporary composers.

Biography 
His father was a farmer and played for entertainment and dancing. His father made sure that the son received piano lessons. Matthus attended secondary school in Rheinsberg, followed by studies at the Hochschule für Musik Hanns Eisler in Berlin. After graduating, he continued his studies in composition with Rudolf Wagner-Régeny and Hanns Eisler, and was shortly thereafter made the youngest composer in residence in the history of the Komische Oper Berlin by Walter Felsenstein.

Stage works 
Matthus composed more than a dozen stage works. The opera Die Weise von Liebe und Tod des Cornets Christoph Rilke (Cornet Christoph Rilke's song of love and death ) after Rainer Maria Rilke was completed in 1983, first performed in Dresden in 1985, and performed also by the Glyndebourne Touring Opera in 1993. The opera Graf Mirabeau (1987–88) is set during the French Revolution. It was commissioned for the 200th anniversary of Bastille Day and enjoyed simultaneous productions in both East and West Germany as well as Czechoslovakia, the Soviet Union and France. The opera was recorded by the Berlin State Opera. Other opera recordings include his Old Testament-based "opera vision" Judith (1984) by Komische Oper Berlin and Der letzte Schuss with the Berlin Radio Symphony Orchestra. In 2003 he composed music for both a ballet and an opera adaptation of Michael Ende's The Neverending Story.

Orchestral music 
Matthus was a prolific composer of works for orchestra as well as chamber and recital compositions. In 1979, Responso, a four-movement symphony was played by the Dresdner Staatskapelle in front of the UN in New York City with a worldwide broadcast. He enjoyed a close working relationship with conductor Kurt Masur who presented many world premieres of his music. Masur also conducted what Matthus called "the commission of my life", a Te Deum for the reopening of the Dresden Frauenkirche after restoration, broadcast live on 11 November 2005. His works are featured on more than twenty recordings by several of Germany's leading symphony orchestras and chamber music ensembles. His 1975 Cello Concerto and his Second Symphony were recorded in 1978 by cellist Josef Schwab and the orchestra of the Komische Oper, conducted by the composer. A reviewer described the works as "deeply honest, uncompromising though highly communicative". For the occasion of his 70th birthday in 2004, a recording combined three concertos with orchestra recorded earlier with the Rundfunk-Sinfonieorchester Saarbrücken: the 1982 Concerto for Trumpet and Percussion, the 1994 Manhattan Concerto, and Der Wald (The forest), a 1984 percussion concerto. On 25 January 2009, Leon Botstein conducted Responso at the Avery Fisher Hall, New York City, with the American Symphony Orchestra.

Festival 
In 1991, Matthus founded the Kammeroper Schloss Rheinsberg festival. He was its artistic director until 2018. He was an honorary citizen of Rheinsberg.

Personal life 
Since 1957, Matthus was married to the singer Helga Matthus. Matthus died in his home on 27 August 2021 at the age of 87 after a protracted illness.

Compositions 
Source:

Matthus composed more than 600 works. His oeuvre includes 14 operas, over 60 large orchestral works, numerous chamber music, ballet scenes and film music.

Opera 
 1960–63 Lazarillo von Tormes
 1966/67 Der letzte Schuss (The Last Shot)
 1971 Noch einen Löffel Gift, Liebling? (Another Spoonful of Poison, Darling?) (Comic crime opera by Peter Hacks after the comedy Risky Marriage by Saul O'Hara)
 1972–74 Omphale (text by Hacks)
 1974 Mario the Magician
 1983/84 Die Weise von Liebe und Tod des Cornets Christoph Rilke (Cornet Christoph Rilke's song of love and death ) (text after Rainer Maria Rilke)
 1982–84 Judith (after the play by Friedrich Hebbel)
 1987/88 Graf Mirabeau
 1990 "Judith" American Premiere at the Santa Fe Opera
 1990/91 Desdemona und ihre Schwestern (Desdemona and her Sisters) (text after Christine Brückner)
 1998 Farinelli oder die Macht des Gesanges (Farinelli or The Power of Singing)
 1998/99  (libretto by Thomas Höft)
 2003 Die unendliche Geschichte (after Michael Ende's The Neverending Story commissioned by the Department for Culture of Rhineland-Palatinate, libretto by Anton Perrey)
 2007: Cosima, reconstruction of an opera fragment by Friedrich Nietzsche
 2019: Effi Briest, after the novel by Theodor Fontane commissioned by Staatstheater Cottbus, to a libretto by

Awards
 1972 and 1984 National Prize of the GDR, 2nd class
 1979 Patriotic Order of Merit in bronze
 1984 honorary citizen of the city of Rheinsberg
 1995/96 Prize of the International Theater Institute Berlin
 1998 Prize of the Association of German Critics
 2000 Officer's Cross of the Order of Merit of the Federal Republic of Germany
 2007 Renaming of the new event hall in the port village of Rheinsberg to the "Siegfried-Matthus-Arena"
 2014 Commander's Cross of the Order of Merit of the Federal Republic of Germany

References

External links 

 
 Siegfried Matthus at Breitkopf & Härtel
 Siegfried Matthus at Interklang, a publisher for the works of Matthus (in German)
 
 Entries for recordings by Siegfried Matthus on WorldCat

German opera composers
Male opera composers
German opera directors
Hochschule für Musik Hanns Eisler Berlin alumni
People from East Prussia
1934 births
2021 deaths
Commanders Crosses of the Order of Merit of the Federal Republic of Germany
Members of the Academy of Arts, Berlin
German male classical composers